Pellegrino Ascani was an Italian painter of the 17th century. Born in Carpi and active in Lombardy as a still life painter of fruits and flowers. His brother Simone was also a painter.

References

17th-century Italian painters
Italian male painters
Renaissance painters
Italian still life painters
Year of death unknown
Year of birth unknown